Trepobates panamensis is a species of water strider in the family Gerridae. It is found from southern Sonora, Mexico throughout Central America to Venezuela and Ecuador.

References

Trepobatinae
Insects described in 1952